Epping Green  may refer to the following places in England:

Epping Green, Essex
Epping Green, Hertfordshire, a location